Xuxa is a Brazilian singer, presenter, actress and 2 times Latin Grammy Award for Best Latin Children's Album winner. This is a list of her songs and albums. Xuxa has a total of more than 30 million albums sold worldwide, Xuxa is the second female artist to have most songs at the No. 1 spot in Brazil, she have 12 song at the number one spot. By 2008, Xuxa is the best-selling female singer in Brazil.

Xuxa became notorious after presenting the Clube da Criança program on Rede Manchete between 1984 and 1985, and soon after released their first studio album or soundtrack: Clube da Criança in 1984 and Xuxa e Seus Amigos in 1985. However, it was with the albums of collection Xou da Xuxa, who have had significant sales that she achieved success.

Only with their first album in Som Livre, Xou da Xuxa released in July 1986, at the height of the Cruzado Plan, Xuxa reached the 2.689 million copies mark - surpassing all records released in Brazil that year, of the "phenomenon" RPM with Rádio Pirata ao Vivo, to king Roberto Carlos, becoming the largest seller in the country drives. Her third musical work, Xegundo Xou da Xuxa released in 1987 sold more than 2.754 million copies, surpassing sales in the previous album.

In 1988, Xuxa would reach impressive sales figures like no other Brazilian artist. Her fourth studio album Xou da Xuxa 3, launched on 30 June of that year, has established itself as the most significant album in sales in the Latin American market at the time, becoming the most successful album of her career, selling over 3,216,000 copies. Of the same album, came out one of the most known children's songs from Brazil, "Ilariê", which remained at No. 1 for 20 consecutive weeks in the Brazilian charts, was the most performed song on the radio along with Faz Parte do Meu Show, of the singer Cazuza, in his version in Spanish, the song reached the 11th position on the Billboard Latin Songs in 1989.

Xuxa became phenomenon also abroad, recording albums in Spanish for the Latin American market. Her first international job was with Xuxa 1, album released at the end of 1989 in Latin America and later in countries such as the United States, Spain and Portugal. The album reached the milestone of 300,000 copies sold, and reached the 4th position on the Billboard Latin Pop Albums. With Xuxa 2, the singer hit the mark three singles on the Billboard Hot Latin Songs with "Loquita Por Tí", "Luna de Cristal" and "Chindolele", the best placed of all, reaching the 10th position and remaining 14 weeks followed in the chart. In 1992, with the single "Sensación de Vivir" from album Xuxa 3, the singer debut first in the Top 10 of the most played songs of Spain. In Latin America, which Cosa Buena from the same album, positioned in 30th place on the Billboard Hot Latin Tracks chart. In Latin America, Que Cosa Buena from the same album, came to reach 30th on the Billboard Hot Latin Tracks.

In tours in Brazil and other countries, Xuxa hit attendance records at shows in cities such as Rio de Janeiro, with about 200,000 people (Maracanã Stadium - 1998), São Paulo with 300 thousand people (1997), Fortaleza over 60,000 people (Arena Castelão - 1996) and 100,000 people in Buenos Aires in Argentina (Velez Sarsfield Stadium - 1991).

Xuxa entered four times in the list of the best selling of all time Brazil albums, occupying the positions number 2, 5, 6 and 8 ranking. Also, is among the "50 women who sold more albums in music history", and the Brazilian artist who sold more albums abroad. It is also recognized as artist who sold more albums by Som Livre label.

In 2000, Xuxa só para Baixinhos series becomes an icon in the Brazilian children's market. With twelve editions, plus three DVDs with records shows four boxes of options with collections, the audiovisual occupies the list of best-selling DVDs in the country, the series has racked up sales of nine million copies. Creator and producer of the project, Xuxa was a precursor to launch the first XSPB. The big gamble paid off, and the album became a huge success, generating annual releases, with varied themes and participations by renowned guests on Brazilian music. The public recognition came with the approval of criticism. Nominated for Latin Grammy Award for Best Latin Children's Album five times, Xuxa brought two statues home.

In 2009, Xuxa broke her contract with Som Livre label and signed with Sony Music. By Sony launched their last four albums, Natal Mágico (2009) and Baixinhos, Bichinhos e Mais (2010). The Sustentabilidade album released in 2013, was her first DVD with 3D technology, and cost $1 million to the coffers of Sony Music. Her last work in label, was with the twelfth edition of XSPB, É Pra Dançar, released in June 2013.

In 2014, after five years at Sony Music, the singer returns the cast of Som Livre.

Albums

Studio albums

International albums

Compilations

Soundtracks

Singles

National singles

International singles

Videography

Video albums

Note

References

Discographies of Brazilian artists
Latin pop music discographies